Andrei Sergeyevich Nikolayev (born 6 August 1976) is a Russian professional football coach and a former player.

Club career
He made his professional debut in the Russian Second Division in 1992 for FC Torpedo-d Moscow. He played 3 games in the UEFA Cup 1996–97 for FC Torpedo-Luzhniki Moscow. He also played 1 game for FC Krylia Sovetov Samara in the Russian Cup.

References

1976 births
Footballers from Moscow
Living people
Russian footballers
Association football midfielders
FC Torpedo Moscow players
FC Torpedo-2 players
Russian Premier League players
PFC CSKA Moscow players
PFC Krylia Sovetov Samara players
FC Khimki players
FC Chernomorets Novorossiysk players
Russian football managers